Mount Thuillier is a mountain on Great Nicobar Island, located in the Indian Ocean and bordering on the Andaman Sea.

The mountain is composed of parallel ridges of folded turbidite sandstone.

The island's five perennial rivers – the Galathea, Jubilee, Amrit Kaur, Dak Aniang, and Dak Tayal – all originate from Mount Thullier. The Galathea River is the longest, flowing southwards for about 30 km to empty into the sea at Galathea Bay near the southern tip of the island.

The hill is thought to have arisen due to tectonic activity in the region.

References

Great Nicobar Island
Mountains of the Andaman and Nicobar Islands